Singafrotypa is a genus of African orb-weaver spiders first described by Pierre L.G. Benoit in 1962.

Species
 it contains four species:
Singafrotypa acanthopus (Simon, 1907) (type) – Ivory Coast, Equatorial Guinea (Bioko), Congo
Singafrotypa mandela Kuntner & Hormiga, 2002 – South Africa
Singafrotypa okavango Kuntner & Hormiga, 2002 – Botswana
Singafrotypa subinermis (Caporiacco, 1940) – Ethiopia

References

Araneidae
Araneomorphae genera
Spiders of Africa